Jess Higgs (born 25 May 1989), known professionally as George Maple, is an Australian born, LA based recording artist, songwriter and record producer.
 In 2017, Maple released her own debut album, Lover which debuted at #2 on the Australian iTunes Chart. Lover featured US rapper GoldLink and Rome Fortune.

Alongside the album she released a series of self directed and produced music videos. In early 2018, she commenced her first national headline tour, the Lover Tour and supported New Zealand singer Lorde.

Maple has performed at international festivals Coachella, Lollapalooza and EDC Vegas, as well as Australian festivals; Field Day, Splendour in the Grass, Groovin the Moo and FOMO festival. Maple is known for her theatrical fashion and has been described as a ’fashion icon’ by Australian mainstream media. Her style has been featured in Vogue, Interview magazine, and ELLE, among others.

As an artist, ghostwriter and producer she has over 400 million Spotify streams. She has written and produced for artists such as DJ Snake, What So Not, Flume, Goldroom, Guy Sebastian, Hayden James and Flight Facilities.  Maple is the pitched down voice of Hayden James hit ‘Something About You.’

In 2019 Maple launched her concept performance ‘Utopia’ and announced the launch of her multi-medium production company ‘The Process.’ She also announced artist development initiative and management company T.B.C.A.

Maple released her second LP in 2020.

Discography

Albums

Extended plays

Singles

Appearances and credits

References

External links
 

Living people
21st-century Australian singers
Musicians from Sydney
Australian women pop singers
21st-century Australian women singers
1992 births